Clepsis flavifasciaria is a species of moth of the family Tortricidae. It is found in Shaanxi, China.

The length of the forewings is 9.5 mm for males and 10.5 mm for females. The ground colour of the forewings is blackish brown, with brightly yellowish fascia below the costal edge. The hindwings are yellow, with a black termen.

Etymology
The species name refers to the brightly yellowish fascia below the costal edge of the forewings and is derived from Latin flavus (meaning yellow) and fasciarius (meaning fascia).

References

Moths described in 2003
Clepsis